Bernard Sabrier, is a Swiss financial entrepreneur. Born on 12 February 1953, he took over the Geneva-based company Unigestion from his father in 1976 and established it as one of Europe’s leading managers of private equity, equities, and multi asset portfolios. 

In addition to driving Unigestion’s growth as Chairman, Sabrier is focused on his charitable activities, establishing the Children’s Action charity in 1994 and the Famsa Foundation in 2011. 

He is also an art enthusiast who co-founded the Museum of Modern Art in Geneva in 1994 and is active on various boards and bodies including the Marshall Institute for Philanthropy and Social Entrepreneurship at the London School of Economics. He is also involved with the Global Commission on Science Missions for Sustainability.

Career

Early career 

Bernard Sabrier started his career in finance working at Paribas in Geneva from 1972, followed by a stint at Renault Finance between 1975 and 1976, where he focused on fixed income and foreign currency investments.

Unigestion 

Unigestion, which is headquartered in Geneva, has offices in 10 locations in Europe, North America, and Asia, and focuses mainly on managing assets for institutional clients and high net worth families.

Over the past two decades, Unigestion has integrated social responsibility into its business; developing its capabilities as a responsible investor. In 2011, Sabrier established the Swiss-regulated Famsa Foundation as the controlling shareholder in Unigestion (see Charitable Activities). Other shareholders include employees and institutional investors.

Charitable Activities 
Bernard Sabrier is involved in several charitable projects. He established the Children Action charity in 1994 and the Famsa Foundation in 2011. He is actively involved in both organisations as Chairman.

He has spoken frequently on how donors should give with the right mindset to get the right results for beneficiaries, clearly understanding the responsibilities they have to not only give money but to ensure projects they support are managed well with leadership, understanding and humility.

Children Action 
Children Action works to make a difference in the lives of disadvantaged children around the world. The charity works with professionals to address issues facing children, including healthcare access, education, psychological support, and youth suicide and by the end of 2020, had directly helped 154,000 beneficiaries. 

One of the charity’s major ongoing commitments is to help reduce the suicide rate among teenagers in Switzerland and in 1996 it worked with University Hospitals of Geneva to establish a crisis unit to focus on suicide care and prevention. It also implements surgical programmes aimed at providing medical care to children, partnering with around 40 top-level European surgeons to provide treatment and the transfer of knowledge to local medical teams in countries such as Vietnam, Cameroon and Myanmar. Over 340 surgical missions have been organised, and 14,500 operations carried out since the Charity's creation.  

The charity has provided 5.5 million meals to children in Vietnam since starting its nutrition programme in 2007. it has also supported families in need in French-speaking Switzerland during the COVID-19 pandemic with many thousands of essential products for children. These include almost 51,000 litres of milk, close to 15,000 fruit and vegetable baskets, 480,000 diapers and 3,500 cans of baby milk powder.

Famsa Foundation 
The Famsa Foundation was established in 2011 as the controlling shareholder of asset manager Unigestion. The Foundation is regulated in Switzerland by the Federal Supervisory Authority of Foundations and is an autonomous legal entity irrevocably committed to carry out its defined purpose.

Dividends generated by Unigestion are used by Famsa to make large financial contributions to projects in the charitable, educational, cultural and medical fields. The largest beneficiaries are projects catering to the specific needs of children, arts and culture and medical research and include Children Action, Harlem Children’s Zone, the Fondation privee des HUG, Beirut Art Center, Mamco, Les Amis du Musee du Louvre (Paris), Le CHUV (Lausanne), Fondazione Mater and Centre Otium.

Other Interests 
Sabrier is a keen photographer and art enthusiast. He co-founded the Museum of Modern Art in Geneva in 1994 and in 2020, Steidl published a book of his photography on the people of Vanuatu, with whom he has formed a personal bond.

He is also active on a number of boards and bodies. In December 2021, Sabrier became a member of the Global Commission on Science Missions for Sustainability at the International Science Council to help mobilise a $100m a year global fund for sustainability science missions in the critical areas of food, energy and climate, health and wellbeing, water and urban areas.

He is also a member of the Advisory Council of the Marshall Institute for Philanthropy and Social Entrepreneurship at the London School of Economics, working to improve the impact and effectiveness of private action for public benefit. In 2022, he joined the Advisory Board of the Marshall Impact Accelerator.

References

Sources
 Unigestion (www.unigestion.com) 
Famsa Foundation (https://www.famsafoundation.org)
Children Action (https://www.childrenaction.org) 
Tigerhall podcast on Using your wealth for good (https://tigerhall.com/content/podcast/using-your-wealth-for-good)
Philanthropy (https://www.forbes.com/sites/forbesinsights/2015/03/18/the-top-three-most-difficult-decisions-for-philanthropists/#18720ce97178), Forbes, March 18, 2015
 Famsa Foundation (http://www.agefi.com/home/suisse-economie-politique/detail/edition/online/article/le-reseau-romand-doncologie-met-a-disposition-des-patients-souffrant-dun-cancer-avance-de-toute-la-suisse-romande-une-plateforme-dexpertise-commune-en-visioconference-en-un-an-300-463879.html), Agefi, October 27, 2017
 Le Temps interview on suicide issues (https://www.letemps.ch/societe/geneve-suicide-jeunes-nest-plus-une-fatalite), Le Temps, August 29, 2017
Book of Photography on Vanuatu (https://steidl.de/Books/Vanuatu-0315455259.html)
FT Moral Money interview (https://www.ft.com/content/78b66909-4635-4e22-8482-967ef069fa46), 10 October 2021
Bilan interview - 'The Eternal Enthusiast' (https://www.bilan.ch/entreprises/bernard-sabrier-leternel-enthousiaste?tpcc=40620-140-01-001.1), 25 June 2019

Living people
1953 births
Swiss businesspeople